Mangalapura may refer to:

India
 Mangalpur, a location in Balasore district, Odisha
 Mangalpur, Kanpur Dehat, a town in Uttar Pradesh
 Mangalapuram or Mangalore, a city in Karnataka

Nepal
 Mangalpur, Nepal, a location